Coates Rocks are a small group of rocks in the northwest part of Evans Neve, at the south side of the Freyberg Mountains, Victoria Land, Antarctica. The group was mapped by the United States Geological Survey from surveys and from U.S. Navy air photos 1960–64, and named by the Advisory Committee on Antarctic Names for Donald A. Coates, United States Antarctic Research Program geologist at Hallett Station, summer 1964–65, and McMurdo Station, Hut Point Peninsula, Ross Island, 1966–67. These rocks are situated on the Pennell Coast, a portion of Antarctica lying between Cape Williams and Cape Adare.

References
 

Rock formations of Victoria Land
Pennell Coast